The Hunter Passage 450 is an American sailboat that was designed by the Hunter Design Team as a cruiser and first built in 1996.

Production
The design was built by Hunter Marine in the United States, but it is now out of production.

Design
The Hunter Passage 450 is a recreational keelboat, built predominantly of  hand-laid polyester and vinylester resin fiberglass, with a deck made from a fiberglass and marine plywood sandwich and Baltek end-grain balsa core hull above the waterline. It has a masthead sloop B&R rig, a raked stem, a walk-through reverse transom with a swimming platform and folding ladder, an oval-shaped center cockpit, a fiberglass mainsheet arch, an internally mounted spade-type rudder controlled by a wheel. It displaces  and carries  of lead ballast.

Standard equipment includes dual staterooms, with private heads and a transom hot and cold water shower. Air conditioning, a clothing washer and drier, a bathtub, and in-mast furling mainsail were factory options. The design has Community of Europe certification for "unlimited offshore use".

Operational history
Reviewer Quentin Warren, writing for Cruising World in 2002 praised the design's accommodations. He wrote: "This boat is comfortable to be aboard, light and airy, easy to handle from the cockpit, big on tankage, chockablock with amenities and perks - it’s no surprise that people are queued well down boat-show docks for the obligatory look-see. It isn’t traditional or classic or reserved; rather it’s a showcase of modern thinking with liveaboard focus."

See also
List of sailing boat types

Similar sailboats
C&C 45
Hunter 45
Hunter 456

References

Keelboats
1980s sailboat type designs
Sailing yachts
Sailboat type designs by Hunter Design Team
Sailboat types built by Hunter Marine